A dirt road or track is a type of unpaved road not paved with asphalt, concrete, brick, or stone; made from the native material of the land surface through which it passes, known to highway engineers as subgrade material. Dirt roads are suitable for vehicles; a narrower path for pedestrians, animals, and possibly small vehicles would be called a dirt track—the distinction is not well-defined. Unpaved roads with a harder surface made by the addition of material such as gravel and aggregate (stones), might be referred to as dirt roads in common usage but are distinguished as improved roads by highway engineers. (Improved unpaved roads include gravel roads, laterite roads, murram roads and macadamized roads.) 

Compared to a gravel road, a dirt road is not usually graded regularly to produce an enhanced camber to encourage rainwater to drain off the road, and drainage ditches at the sides may be absent. They are unlikely to have embankments through low-lying areas. This leads to greater waterlogging and erosion, and after heavy rain the road may be impassable even to off-road vehicles. For this reason, in some countries, such as Australia and New Zealand and Finland, they are known as dry-weather roads.

Dirt roads take on different characteristics according to the soils and geology where they pass, and may be sandy, stony, rocky or have a bare earth surface, which could be extremely muddy and slippery when wet, and baked hard when dry. They are likely to become impassable after rain. They are common in rural areas of many countries, often very narrow and infrequently used, and are also found in metropolitan areas of many developing countries, where they may also be used as major highways and have considerable width.

Terms similar to dirt road are dry-weather road, earth road, or the "Class Four Highway" designation used in the People's Republic of China. A track, dirt track, or earth track would normally be similar but less suitable for larger vehicles.

Dirt roads almost always form a washboard-like surface with ridges. The reason for this is that dirt roads have tiny irregularities; a wheel hitting a bump pushes it forward, making it bigger, while a wheel pushing over a bump pushes dirt into the next bump. However, the surface can remain flat for velocities less than 5 mph.

Driving on dirt roads
While most gravel roads are all-weather roads and can be used by ordinary cars, dirt roads may only be passable by trucks or four-wheel drive vehicles, especially in wet weather, or on rocky or very sandy sections. It is as easy to become bogged in sand as it is in mud; a high clearance under the vehicle may be required for rocky sections.

Driving on dirt roads requires great attention to variations in the surface and it is easier to lose control than on a gravel road.

Laterite and murram roads
In Africa, parts of Asia, and parts of the Americas, laterite soils are used to build dirt roads. However, laterite (called murram in East Africa), varies considerably.  It ranges from a hard gravel to a softer earth embedded with small stones.  Not all laterite and murram roads are therefore strictly gravel roads.  Laterite and murram which contains a significant proportion of clay becomes very slippery when wet, and in the rainy season, it may be difficult even for four-wheel drive vehicles to avoid slipping off very cambered roads into the drainage ditches at the side of the road.  As it dries out, such laterite can become very hard, like sun-dried bricks.

Image gallery

References

See also 

 Byway (road)
 Country lane
 Green lane (road)
 Trail

Types of roads